Luke Whisnant (born 1957) is an American novelist, short story writer and poet. His first novel, Watching TV with the Red Chinese, was published in 1992 and was made into a feature film in 2010. Street, a poetry chapbook, was published in 1990; Down in the Flood, a collection of short stories, appeared in 2006; and Above Floodstage, an 800-line narrative poem, was published in 2014. Whisnant earned his B.A. in English from East Carolina University and his M.F.A. in creative writing from Washington University in St. Louis. He is Professor of English at East Carolina University, where he also edits Tar River Poetry.

Works 
Street. Portlandville NY: MAF Press, 1990. 
Watching TV with the Red Chinese. Chapel Hill: Algonquin, 1992.   
Down in the Flood.  Knoxville: Iris, 2006.  
Above Floodstage: A Narrative Poem.  Georgetown KY: Finishing Line, 2014.

References

External links 
" Luke Whisnant's Homepage

20th-century American novelists
21st-century American novelists
American male novelists
Novelists from North Carolina
East Carolina University alumni
East Carolina University faculty
1957 births
Living people
20th-century American poets
21st-century American poets
American male poets
Chapbook writers
American male short story writers
20th-century American short story writers
21st-century American short story writers
20th-century American male writers
21st-century American male writers
Washington University in St. Louis alumni